Jackpot (also known as Cyber Eden) is a 1992 Italian sci-fi-adventure film directed by Mario Orfini.

The film was a box office bomb, grossing just 158 million lire at the Italian box office against a budget of 18 billions lire.

Plot 
In Italy an old female billionaire has created a multinational company called Financial Youth Foundation, which has taken seven prodigies children who work with new computers. The purpose of the foundation is to restore youth to old with artificial products. The gardener of the villa of the old billionaire, Furio, discovers that this effect of youth, apparently beneficial, is a plan to exploit people with technology. So Furio is opposed to this system, so that the seven children and the younger generation can savor the beauty of nature, fighting the false and malicious technology.

Cast 

 Adriano Celentano as Furio
 Kate Vernon as Prudunce
 Salvatore Cascio as Cosimo 
 Carroll Baker as Madame
 Scott Magensen as Vladimir
 Christopher Lee as Cedric 
 Johnny Melville as Synthetic man

See also    
 List of Italian films of 1992

References

External links

Italian science fiction adventure films
1990s science fiction adventure films
1990s Italian-language films
English-language Italian films
1990s English-language films
Films scored by Giorgio Moroder
Films scored by Anthony Marinelli
1992 multilingual films
Italian multilingual films
1990s Italian films